is a Japanese writer. She has won the All Yomimono Prize for New Writers and the Yamamoto Shūgorō Prize, she has been nominated multiple times for the Naoki Prize, and her novels have been adapted for television, radio, and film.

Early life and education
Yuzuki was born in Tokyo in 1981. During her early school years she read books by foreign authors,  including Beverly Cleary's Ramona series, Anne of Green Gables, and Judy Blume's young adult novels. While in junior high school Yuzuki had a serious illness, and during her recovery she read the novel Kitchen by Banana Yoshimoto, which convinced her to read more Japanese literature. She later attended Rikkyo University, where she studied French literature.  After submitting a senior thesis on Honoré de Balzac and graduating from college Yuzuki worked for a confectionery maker, but later quit to focus on her writing.

Career
In 2008 Yuzuki won the 88th All Yomimono Prize for New Writers for the story "Forget Me, Not Blue", about bullying in a Protestant all-girls school in Tokyo. The story was first published in the literary magazine All Yomimono and later collected with three other connected stories into the 2010 volume , which became Yuzuki's first published book. In 2011 her novel , about a woman who becomes frustrated with the prevalence of attractive people online and attempts to vandalize a beauty web site, was published by Asahi Shimbun and subsequently adapted into an NHK BS Premium television comedy series starring Akiko Yada.

It was later adapted into a 2018 NHK radio drama. , a book containing four connected short stories about the increasingly personal relationship between a young office worker and her older female boss, was published by Futabasha. It was later adapted into a 2015 NHK BS Premium television drama of the same name, starring Misako Renbutsu and Naho Toda.

, a series of linked short stories about different women who are each interested in the same man, was published in 2013 by Gentosha. Ito-kun A to E was nominated for the 150th Naoki Prize, marking Yuzuki's first nomination for the prize. She did not win, as the 150th Naoki Prize was awarded to Makate Asai and Kaoruko Himeno. The book was later adapted into the 2017 romantic comedy television series The Many Faces of Ito, starring Fumino Kimura and directed by Ryūichi Hiroki. A movie version was also released in theaters.

Yuzuki was subsequently nominated for the Naoki Prize several more times. Her novel , a story about a years-long friendship between two girls from different backgrounds, was published by Shinchosha in 2014 and nominated for the 151st Naoki Prize. She did not win, as the award went to Hiroyuki Kurakawa. In 2015 Yuzuki's novel , a story about two women whose lives intersect as one blackmails the other, was published by Bungeishunjū. Nile Perch Women's Club won the 28th Yamamoto Shūgorō Prize. It was also nominated for the 153rd Naoki Prize, but the award went to comedian Naoki Matayoshi.

Yuzuki's fourth Naoki Prize nomination came in 2017, when her novel BUTTER was nominated for the 157th Naoki Prize. BUTTER, a story about a reporter investigating a woman accused of luring men with her cooking and then killing them, was loosely based on an actual series of suspicious deaths of middle-aged men that led to murder convictions and a death sentence for Kanae Kijima. Yuzuki did not win the 157th Naoki Prize, as the award went to Shogo Sato. 

In 2018, Yuzuki's novel  was published by Shōdensha. The following year she was nominated a fifth time for the Naoki Prize, for her book .

Recognition
 2008 88th All Yomimono Prize for New Writers
 2015 28th Yamamoto Shūgorō Prize

Adaptations
 Nageki no bijo, NHK BS Premium, 2013
 Ranchi no Akko-chan, NHK BS Premium, 2015
 The Many Faces of Ito, MBS/Netflix, 2017
 Ōhi no kikan, NHK FM (radio), 2018

Selected works
 , Bungeishunjū, 2010,  (includes "Forget Me, Not Blue")
 , Asahi Shimbun Shuppan, 2011, 
 , Jitsugyō no Nihonsha, 2013, 
 , Futabasha, 2013, 
 , Gentosha, 2013, 
 , Bungeishunjū, 2015, 
 , Shinchosha, 2017, 
 , Shōdensha, 2018, 
 , Asahi Shimbun Shuppan, 2019,

References

1981 births
Living people
21st-century Japanese novelists
21st-century Japanese women writers
Japanese women novelists
Rikkyo University alumni
Writers from Tokyo